The 1978 Georgia Bulldogs football team represented the Georgia Bulldogs of the University of Georgia during the 1978 NCAA Division I-A football season.

Schedule

Roster

Season summary

at Kentucky

Rex Robinson kicked a 29-yard field goal with three seconds left to win it for Georgia.

Georgia Tech

Buck Belue's 42-yard pass to Amp Arnold and Arnold's two-point conversion put Georgia ahead with 2:24 left in the game.

References

Georgia
Georgia Bulldogs football seasons
Georgia Bulldogs football